Geoff Ward (born April 8, 1962) is a Canadian professional ice hockey coach who is an assistant coach for the Anaheim Ducks of the National Hockey League (NHL). He previously worked as the head coach of the Calgary Flames and as an assistant coach for the New Jersey Devils, the Boston Bruins, and the Flames. He won the Stanley Cup with the Bruins in 2011.

Career
Ward started his coaching career as an assistant at the University of Waterloo in 1989 and remained on the Warriors’ coaching staff for three years. In the 1993–94 season, Ward guided the Waterloo Siskins to an MWJHL championship and then served a five-year stint as head coach of the Kitchener Rangers in the Ontario Hockey League.

Ward's first coaching job in Europe came in the 2000–01 season, when he worked for German second-division side EC Bad Nauheim. Back in North America, while coaching the Hamilton Bulldogs, Ward was named the American Hockey League's Coach of the Year, winning the Louis A.R. Pieri Memorial Award for the 2002–03 AHL season. After two years with the Toronto Roadrunners/Edmonton Road Runners organization, he took over the Iserlohn Roosters of the German Deutsche Eishockey Liga, before embarking on a seven-year stint as assistant coach of the Boston Bruins, contributing to winning the Stanley Cup in 2011.

On June 19, 2014, it was announced that Ward would take over from Hans Zach as head coach for the German DEL pro hockey league's Adler Mannheim for the 2014–15 DEL season. He won the DEL Coach of the Year award and the DEL Championship that same year. Ward's team won the regular season championship and lost only one playoff game on its way to the finals, where the Adler squad defeated ERC Ingolstadt 4–2: Mannheim won the first game of the finals in overtime and then lost two in a row. Three consecutive wins secured the title in the best-of-seven series.

On June 17, 2015, Ward was named an assistant coach for the New Jersey Devils.

On May 31, 2018, the Calgary Flames announced that Ward, along with the Flames' AHL affiliate Stockton Heat's head coach Ryan Huska, would join the Flames as assistants under new head coach Bill Peters.

On November 26, 2019, Brad Treliving, the Flames' general manager, announced that Ward would assume the head coaching duties for the game against the Buffalo Sabres on November 27, while an investigation into allegations of racism and assault against Peters was conducted. Peters resigned on November 29 and Ward became the interim head coach. On September 14, 2020, Ward was formally named head coach.

On March 4, 2021, Ward was relieved of his duties as head coach after an 11–11–2 start to the season for the Flames. He was hired by Anaheim as an assistant to head coach Dallas Eakins on June 15, 2021.

`

Head coaching record

NHL

 Shortened season due to the COVID-19 pandemic during the 2019–20 season. Playoffs were played in August 2020 with a different format.

Other leagues

References

External links

Geoff Ward's profile at EliteProspects.com

1962 births
Living people
American Hockey League coaches
Boston Bruins coaches
Calgary Flames coaches
Edmonton Oilers coaches
Guelph Storm coaches
Ice hockey people from Ontario
Kitchener Rangers coaches
New Jersey Devils coaches
Sportspeople from Waterloo, Ontario
Stanley Cup champions